The 7th Nuestra Belleza México pageant, was held at the Auditorio Emilio Sánchez Piedras of Apizaco, Tlaxcala, Mexico on September 2, 2000. Forty-three contestants of the Mexican Republic competed for the national title, which was won by Jacqueline Bracamontes from Jalisco, who later competed in Miss Universe 2001 in Puerto Rico. Bracamontes was crowned by outgoing Nuestra Belleza México titleholder Leticia Murray. She was the first Jalisciense and the second winner of foreign descent (her maternal grandparents are Belgian) and the third blonde to win this Title.

The Nuestra Belleza Mundo México title was assumed by Paulina Flores from Sinaloa after Jacqueline Bracamontes won the right to compete in Miss Universe, she had been the original winner of this title but she could not hold both titles, and then Paulina Flores as Suplente/1st Runner-up assumed this Title. She later competed in Miss World 2000 in United Kingdom. She was the first Sinaloense to win this Title.

The Nuestra Belleza Internacional México title (Best Hair Pantene) was won by Lilián Villanueva from Quintana Roo, and she would compete in Miss International 2001 in Japan but the Nuestra Belleza México Organization lost the franchise of this international event this year and then she did not compete. Villanueva is the first and only Quintanarroense to win this Title.

After three years, two events were held separately to select the two winners for the titles Nuestra Belleza México and Nuestra Belleza Mundo México.

Results

Placements Nuestra Belleza México

Order of announcements

Top 10
Sonora
Distrito Federal
Chihuahua
Zacatecas
Jalisco
Quintana Roo
Sinaloa
Distrito Federal
Sinaloa
Nuevo León

Top 5
Zacatecas
Jalisco
Sonora
Quintana Roo
Sinaloa

Nuestra Belleza Mundo México
After three years, returned to take place the semi-final competition entitled "Nuestra Belleza Mexico: Rumbo a Miss Mundo" here was chosen the Top 20 among the 43 candidates, in which was announced the winner of the Nuestra Belleza Mundo México title Jacqueline Bracamontes, a week later she won the title of Nuestra Belleza México and then her Suplene/1st Runner-up Paulina Flores from Sinaloa assumed the Title, who curiously was also the Suplente/1st Runner-up in the final competition. Only the top 20 participated in the final night.

The Nuestra Belleza Mundo México pageant was held at the Auditorio Emilio Sánchez Piedras of Apizaco, Tlaxcala, Mexico and was hosted by Joana Benedek and Alexis Ayala. It was officially the 3rd edition of the "Nuestra Belleza Mundo México" contest and as an official separate pageant to choose Mexico's representative to Miss World. Although the Winner of this event also competed in the final night competition.

The musical part was enlivened by: Pablo Montero.

Order of announcements

Top 20
Coahuila
Baja California Sur
Sonora
Nuevo León
Veracruz
Sinaloa
Chihuahua
Distrito Federal
Zacatecas
Sinaloa

Yucatán
Colima
Nuevo León
San Luis Potosí
Tamaulipas
Sinaloa
Jalisco
Querétaro
Quinatana Roo
Distrito Federal

Special awards

Judges

Preliminary competition
Matilde Obregón – TV Notas' Director
Riccardo Dalmacci – Actor
Héctor Terrones – Fashion Designer
José Luis Abarca – Fashion Designer
Ernesto Valenzuela – El Modelo México 1999
Pablo Méndez – Stylist
Toño Mauri – Actor
Deborah David – Model & Miss Guatemala
Nadine Markova – Photographer

Final competition
Gustavo Adolfo Infante – Journalist
Silvia Galván – Stylist
Benjamín Alarcón – Consultant Psycho-Body Expression
Verónica Jaspeado – Nuestra Belleza Tlaxcala 1994, Actress & Singer
Carlos Latapi – Photographer
Maritza Sayalero – Miss Universe 1979
Gerardo Rebollo – Designer
Vanessa Guzmán – Nuestra Belleza México 1995 & Actress
Fernando Magallanes – Plastic Surgeon
Frances Ondiviela – Miss España 1980 & Actress
Carlos Topete – Marketing Manager

Background music
Opening Number: "Nuestra Belleza México" (Official Theme)
Swimsuit Competition: "Popurrí" by Ernesto D'Alessio, Patricio Borghetti and Jan
Intermediate: "Cuando me Enamoro" & "Aunque no Esté" by Manuel Mijares
Evening Gown Competition: Innis
Intermediate: "Dónde está la Vida" & "Quédate Más" by Francisco Céspedes
Crowning Moment: "Nuestra Belleza México" (Official Theme)

Contestants

Designates

 – Rosalinda Wayas
 – Dulce Ríos
 – María Villalobos
 – Mirta Bojórquez
 Distrito Federal – Paola Hinojosa
 Distrito Federal – Mónica Portillo
 Distrito Federal – Connie Velázquez
 Estado de México – Susana Diazayas
 – Libertad Godínez
 – Gisela Oviedo

 – María González
 – Minerva Rivera
 – María Valenzuela
 – Karla Arias
 – Rubí López
 – Minerva Quintanilla
 – Luz Amelia Bulnes
 – Selena Monsreal
 – Daniela Rubio

Withdrawals

Historical significance
 Jalisco won the Nuestra Belleza México title for the first time.
This was the second time a Winner of Nuestra Belleza México pageant is of foreign descent (Jacqueline Bracamontes, her maternal grandparents are Belgian).
 Sinaloa was the Suplente/1st Runner-up for the second time (before 1999) and won the Nuestra Belleza Mundo México title for the first time.
 Quintana Roo won the Nuestra Belleza Internacional México title for the first time.
 Is the first time in the history of the organization in which more than one representative is sent by State.
Jalisco tear up this year, obtaining the Nuestra Belleza Mundo Mexico title in the semi-final competition, but after being crowned as Nuestra Belleza México automatically the Nuestra Belleza Mundo México title passed to the 1st Runner-up Sinaloa (Paulina Flores), who curiously was also the 1st Runner-up in the semi-final competition.
 For the first time is selected a Top 20 and only the Top 20 selected in the semi-final competition participated in the final night.
 For the first time withdrawing from the competition the states: Aguascalientes, Baja California, Campeche, Durango, Guerrero, Michoacán, Nayarit and Oaxaca.
 Distrito Federal and Nuevo León placed for seventh consecutive year.
 Chihuahua placed for third consecutive year.
 Baja California Sur, Sinaloa, Sonora and Tamaulipas placed for second consecutive year.
 Coahuila, Jalisco, Quintana Roo and Yucatán returned to making calls to the semifinals after two years (1998), Colima after three years (1997), Querétaro, Veracruz and Zacatecas after four years (1996) and San Luis Potosí after five years (1995).
 States that were called to the semi-finals last year and this year failed to qualify were Guanajuato and Morelos.
 After two years to hosted Nuestra Belleza México, Marco Antonio Regil didn't do in this edition.
 For the first time Sergio Goyri and Gabriel Soto hosted the pageant with Lupita Jones.
 Sonora won Miss Photogenic and Edoardos Model Award for the first time.
 Quintana Roo won the Trident Smile and Best Hair Awards for the first time.
 Distrito Federal won Miss America Online for the first time.
 Jalisco won Miss St. Ives and Skin Hinds Award for the first time.
 Chihuahua won the Best Communicator Award for the first time.
 Sinaloa won the Lala Light Figure Award for the first time.
San Luis Potosí won the Best National Costume award for the first time.
 The host delegate, María Guadalupe Lozada from Tlaxcala, failed to place in the semi-finals.
Coahuila (Alma Cantú) is the higher delegate in this edition (1.85 m).
Estado de México (Susana Diazayas), Sinaloa (María Valenzuela) and Tamulipas (Gabriela Soberón) are the lower delegates in this edition (1.68 m).

Contestant notes
  – Jacqueline Bracamontes represented her country in Miss Universe 2001 held at Coliseo Rubén Rodríguez, Bayamón, Puerto Rico on May 11, 2001, where she didn't place. After being crowned Nuestra Belleza México in 2000, she decided to pursue a television career. She began her career hosting various award shows and special programs, including Acafest, Premios TVyNovelas, and Fiesta Mexicana. In 2003, Bracamontes was cast in the Mexican telenovela Alegrijes y Rebujos, produced by Rosy Ocampo. In 2006, she landed her first lead role in the Mexican novela Heridas de Amor, alongside Brazilian born actor Guy Ecker. In 2008 she starred in the comedic Mexican telenovela Las Tontas No Van al Cielo, alongside Jaime Camil, which was extremely successful in both the Latin American and United States market. After finishing filming with Las Tontas No Van al Cielo, Bracamontes starred in Sortilegio, with Cuban actor William Levy. Bracamontes has been linked to actor Valentino Lanús, soccer star Francisco "Kikin" Fonseca, and actor Arturo Carmona. On January 11, 2008, she confirmed her new relationship with Fernando Schoenwald. The couple ended their relationship in May 2009. Bracamontes was chosen as one of the killers in the popular series Mujeres Asesinas which is expected to premier in the fall of 2010.
 Estado de México – Susana Diazayas is a Television Actress.
  – Lilián Villanueva originally would participate in Miss International 2001, but the Nuestra Belleza México Organization lost the franchise and she couldn't compete in that event, although she represented Mexico in the contest Reinado Internacional de las Flores 2001 in Medellín, Colombia where she won 1st place.
  – Paulina Flores represented her country in Miss World 2000, held at the Millennium Dome in London, UK on November 30, 2000. Also she was finalist in the Top 5 in Miss Mesoamérica 2001. Paulina is currently a professional fashion model, and has been represented by several national and international modeling agencies.
 – Evelyn López competed in Miss Costa Maya International 2001.
 – Eva Ruíz represented Mexico in the Reinado Internacional del Café 2001 in Manizales, Colombia where she won 2nd place.

Crossovers
Contestants who previously competed or will compete at other beauty pageants:

Miss Universe
 2001: : Jacqueline Bracamontes

Miss World
 2000: : Paulina Flores

Miss Costa Maya International 
 2001: : Evelyn López

Reinado Internacional de las Flores
 2001: : Lilián Villanueva (Winner)

Reinado Internacional del Café
 2001: : Eva Ruiz (1st Runner-up)

Miss Mesoamérica
 2001: : Paulina Flores (Top 5)

References

External links
Official Website

.México
2000 in Mexico
2000 beauty pageants
September 2000 events in Mexico